Josh is a 2009 Indian Telugu-language coming-of-age political action drama film directed by Vasu Varma in his debut, and produced Dil Raju. The film marks the debut of Akkineni Naga Chaitanya and major Telugu debutant Karthika (daughter of actress Radha Nair in the lead roles, whilst prominent actor J. D. Chakravarthy played an antagonist role. The film's music is scored by Sandeep Chowta.

The plot explores student politics, and the vested interests of politicians in such activities. Released on 5 September 2009, to highly positive reviews for its direction, screenplay, Chaitanya & Prakash Raj's performance, soundtrack & social message. But the film was not commercially successful.

Plot
Satya is a student. He discontinues his graduation studies in Vizag and comes to Hyderabad in search of a job. He stays with his uncle in Hyderabad. He runs into a fight with MGM college students who are influenced by political mafia leader Durga Rao. Satya tries to change the students but fails. Then he gets accidentally hit by the students and gets admitted into the hospital. When questioned by his uncle about his rude behavior with students Satya narrates his flashback.

In the flashback we see a carefree Satya with a gang of his classmates. Although he was a topper until schooling, college environment makes him a stubborn guy. His principal keeps on advising him to change but Satya would just feel it as a lecture. He also makes his principal's sincere son, Bujji join his gang. One day they go on for a bike race and Bujji accompanies Satya on Satya's bike. The bike's chain gets loose and the bike slips leaving Satya injured and causing Bujji's death. This makes Satya to realise.

And now after getting discharged from the hospital, Satya joins the college to cleanse the system. On the other hand, there is Vidhya, an elementary school teacher who aspires to go to college but could not as her brother feels that college students are rowdies and she would not be safe in college. She meets Satya and love blossoms between them. Main crux of the movie is how Satya changes the students and brings them out of the bad influence of Durga Rao.

Cast

Soundtrack

The music was composed by Sandeep Chowtha. The soundtrack, released on 18 July 2009 at Shilparama Vedika.

Release 
Initially scheduled to release on 3 September 2009, the film was delayed due to the death of Andhra Pradesh Chief Minister Y. S. Rajasekhara Reddy. It was eventually released two days later on 5 September 2009.

Reception 
Josh received to positive reviews for its direction, screenplay, Chaitanya & Prakash Raj's performance, soundtrack & social message, but criticised its runtime.Rediff.com critic Radhika Rajmani wrote, "Josh as such, does not have anything new about it. The theme has been touched upon before. The attraction now is Naga Chaitanya who has the movie on his shoulders," while rating the film 3 stars of 5. Idlebrain.com rated 2.75/5 and stated, "The narration and screenplay given by Vasu Varma diluted the main point."

Accolades

Filmfare Awards South
 Won – Filmfare Award for Best Male Debut – South – Naga Chaitanya

Santosham Film Awards
 Won – Santosham Film Award for Best Debut Actress – Karthika Nair

CineMAA Awards
 Won – Best Female Debut – Karthika Nair

References

External links
 

2009 films
2000s Telugu-language films
Films scored by Sandeep Chowta
Indian coming-of-age films
Indian action films
2009 action films
2000s coming-of-age films
Sri Venkateswara Creations films